In epidemiology, a rate ratio, sometimes called an incidence density ratio or incidence rate ratio, is a relative difference measure used to compare the incidence rates of events occurring at any given point in time.  

It is defined as:
 
where incidence rate is the occurrence of an event over person-time (for example person-years):

The same time intervals must be used for both incidence rates.

A common application for this measure in analytic epidemiologic studies is in the search for a causal association between a certain risk factor and an outcome.

See also
Odds ratio
Ratio
Risk ratio

References 

Biostatistics
Epidemiology
Rates